Porkhov is a town and the administrative center of Porkhovsky District in Pskov Oblast, Russia, located on the Shelon River,  east of Pskov, the administrative center of the oblast. Population:

History

The fortress of Porkhov is believed to have been founded in 1239 by Alexander Nevsky. The timber fortress was sacked by Algirdas (Olgierd) in 1356 and fell in flames in 1387. In 1428, Grand Duke of Lithuania Vytautas destroyed the western wall by artillery fire and entered Porkhov. Two years later, the Novgorodians augmented the fortress and rebuilt its walls. After the fall of Novgorod to the Muscovites in 1478, the fortress lost its military importance.

Porkhov was the second most important town of Shelon Pyatina, after Russa. It was not, however, a significant economical center—there were only seventy-six homesteads there in the 15th century and almost all of them were peasant ones.

In 1606, it was captured by Sweden. In the late 19th century, sizeable trade in linen and grain was conducted there.

During World War II, Porkhov was occupied by German troops from July 11, 1941 to February 26, 1944 and was a place of a concentration camp Dulag 100.

The town of Porkhov, together with Porkhovsky District, was transferred to newly established Pskov Oblast from Leningrad Oblast on August 23, 1944.

Administrative and municipal status
Within the framework of administrative divisions, Porkhov serves as the administrative center of Porkhovsky District, to which it is directly subordinated. As a municipal division, the town of Porkhov is incorporated within Porkhovsky Municipal District as Porkhov Urban Settlement.

Architecture
The fortress consists of a well-preserved encircling wall; two towers, one of which is half-ruined; a diminutive church from 1412, and a museum of local history. Inside the fortress there are a great many trees and plants. The church of the Virgin's Nativity, a remarkable monumental erection of the 14th century, was disfigured during the Soviet period (picture). Another church of note in Porkhov is the Savior church (1670).

References

Notes

Sources

Архивный отдел Псковского облисполкома. Государственный архив Псковской области. "Административно-территориальное деление Псковской области (1917–1988 гг.). Справочник". (Administrative-Territorial Structure of Pskov Oblast (1917–1988). Reference.) Книга I. Лениздат, 1988

External links
Porkhov on NortFort.ru
Porkhov's site
The murder of the Jews of Porkhov during World War II, at Yad Vashem website.

Cities and towns in Pskov Oblast
Porkhovsky Uyezd
1239 establishments in Europe
13th-century establishments in Russia
Populated places established in the 1230s
Holocaust locations in Russia